Ricochet Lost Worlds was developed by Reflexive Entertainment and is the sequel to Ricochet Xtreme. It features several new bricks, power-ups and background art. It also has the new "ring" feature, where you try to collect all the rings on each level. If you collect all five rings on every level, you become "Ring Master" and get the trophy at the end of the game. It is possible to beat the game without getting every ring, but it is less challenging.

Around 7 December 2017, the official website that hosted all user-made levels and the forums for both the Ricochet and the Big Kahuna series were permanently shut down because they were no longer sustainable to run.

Gameplay

Ships
There are six (6) designs of ships a player can choose if he or she will sign as a new player. Here are the ships:

Unique Rounds
Some rounds in this game feature unique graphics and show an object. Here are some:

Tools and bricks
Some tools are featured in the game.

Weapons and powerups
Some weapons and powerups are featured in the game. Some have advantages and disadvantages. Italicalized powerups are powerups not available in the game.

References

External links
 Official Reflexive Arcade site
 Official Ricochet Lost Worlds site

2004 video games
Breakout clones
MacOS games
Reflexive Entertainment games
Video game sequels
Windows games
Original Xbox Live Arcade games
Video games developed in the United States